Brandon Wright (born February 18, 1997) is an American football placekicker and punter for the Memphis Showboats of the United States Football League (USFL). He played college football at Georgia State University.

College career
Wright was a member of the Georgia State Panthers for five seasons, redshirting as a true freshman, and was the team's primary punter for four years and kicker for his final two seasons as well.

Professional career

Jacksonville Jaguars
Wright was signed by the Jacksonville Jaguars as an undrafted free agent on April 28, 2020. He was waived on August 8, 2020, but was re-signed to the team's practice squad on September 7, 2020. Wright was promoted to the active roster on September 23, 2020, after Josh Lambo was placed on injured reserve. He suffered a groin injury in Week 3 and was waived/injured on September 28, 2020. He subsequently reverted to the team's injured reserve list on September 29, and was waived with an injury settlement the next day.

Los Angeles Rams
On December 15, 2020, Wright signed with the practice squad of the Los Angeles Rams. On January 18, 2021, Wright signed a reserve/futures contract with the Rams. On August 10, 2021, Wright was waived by the Rams.

Tampa Bay Bandits (USFL)
On February 23, 2022, Wright was selected by the Tampa Bay Bandits with the 4th pick of the 32nd round in the  United States Football League’s (USFL) first inaugural draft.  On June 16, 2022, it was announced that Wright was selected as the punter for the inaugural All-USFL team.

Memphis Showboats
Wright and all other Tampa Bay Bandits players were all transferred to the Memphis Showboats after it was announced that the Bandits were taking a hiatus and that the Showboats were joining the league.

References

External links
 Jacksonville Jaguars bio
 Georgia State Panthers bio

1997 births
Living people
American football placekickers
American football punters
Georgia State Panthers football players
Jacksonville Jaguars players
Los Angeles Rams players
Players of American football from Atlanta
Tampa Bay Bandits (2022) players